
The year 501 BC was a year of the pre-Julian Roman calendar. In the Roman Empire it was known as the Year of the Consulship of Auruncus and Lartius (or, less frequently, year 253  Ab urbe condita). The denomination 501 BC for this year has been used since the early medieval period, when the Anno Domini calendar era became the prevalent method in Europe for naming years.

Events 
 By place 

 Mediterranean 
 Cleisthenes reforms the democracy in Athens.
 In response to threats by the Sabines, Rome creates the office of dictator.
 Gadir (present-day Cadiz) is captured by Carthage. (approximate date)

 Asia 
 Confucius is appointed governor of Chung-tu.

Deaths
 Duke Ai of Qin, ruler of the State of Qin from 537 to 501 BC
 Deng Xi, Chinese philosopher

References